James Anderson (May 28, 1849 – May 31, 1918), born James Anderson Smythe, was a Canadian-born soldier in the U.S. Army who served with the 6th U.S. Cavalry during the Texas–Indian Wars. He was one of six men received the Medal of Honor for gallantry against a hostile band of Plains Indians at the Wichita River in Texas on October 5, 1870.

Biography
James Anderson Smythe was born in Canada on May 28, 1849. He eventually emigrated to the United States and enlisted in the U.S. Army, under the name James Anderson, around 1870. Smythe served with the 6th U.S. Cavalry and assigned frontier duty in Northwestern Texas. On October 5, 1870, he participated in a running battle with hostile Plains Indians at the Wichita River. He and five other men, including Sgt. Michael Welch, Cpl. Samuel Bowden, Cpl. Daniel Keating, Pvt. Benjamin Wilson and Indian guide James B. Doshier, received the Medal of Honor for "gallantry during the pursuit and fight with Indians" a month after what would become known as the "Skirmish at Bluff Creek".

Smythe remained in the army for another ten years, rising to the rank of Second Lieutenant. On November 14, 1880, he married Nellie E. Hanlon and together they moved to St. Louis, Missouri. He worked as stationery engineer for the rest of his life. Smythe's health began to decline in 1917 and he died of pneumonia on May 31, 1918, only three days after his 69th birthday. He was buried at St. Peter and Paul's Cemetery in St. Louis. Smythe was survived by his wife Nellie; the couple had no children.

Medal of Honor citation
Rank and organization: Private, Company M, 6th U.S. Cavalry. Place and date: At Wichita River, Tex., October 5, 1870. Entered service at: ------. Birth: Canada East. Date of issue: November 19, 1870.

Citation:

Gallantry during the pursuit and fight with Indians.

See also

List of Medal of Honor recipients for the Indian Wars

References

External links

1849 births
1918 deaths
United States Army personnel of the Indian Wars
United States Army Medal of Honor recipients
Military personnel from St. Louis
Canadian emigrants to the United States
Canadian-born Medal of Honor recipients
American Indian Wars recipients of the Medal of Honor
Infectious disease deaths in Missouri
United States Army officers
Deaths from pneumonia in Missouri